NK Podgrmeč is a football club from the town of Sanski Most situated in the northwestern part of Bosnia and Herzegovina.

NK Podgrmeč was founded by local WWII hero Milancic Miljevic, on April 4, 1944 in the town of Sanski Most. The colours of the club are green and yellow. NK Podgrmeč currently plays in the First League of the Federation of Bosnia and Herzegovina, after spending six years in lower tier.

References

Sanski Most
Association football clubs established in 1944
Podgrmec
Sport in the Federation of Bosnia and Herzegovina
1944 establishments in Bosnia and Herzegovina